The MTV Europe Music Award for Best Female was one of the original general awards that has been handed out every year since the first annual MTV Europe Music Awards in 1994. In 2007 the award was renamed to Best Solo Artist rewarding the soloists of both sexes, in 2008 the award for Best Female was again eliminated from the EMAs, but it was revived again in 2009 with its original name. Lady Gaga is the biggest winner of the category with three awards.

Winners and nominees
Winners are listed first and highlighted in bold.

† indicates an MTV Video Music Award for Best Female Video–winning artist.
‡ indicates an MTV Video Music Award for Best Female Video–nominated artist that same year.

1990s

2000s

2010s

Statistics

See also
 MTV Video Music Award for Best Female Video

References

MTV Europe Music Awards
Music awards honoring women